The following highways are numbered 221:

Canada
 Manitoba Provincial Road 221
 Newfoundland and Labrador Route 221
 Nova Scotia Route 221
 Prince Edward Island Route 221
 Quebec Route 221
 Saskatchewan Highway 221

China
 China National Highway 221

Costa Rica
 National Route 221

Japan
 Japan National Route 221

United States
 U.S. Route 221
 Alabama State Route 221
 Arkansas Highway 221
 California State Route 221
 Florida State Road 221 (former)
 Georgia State Route 221 (former)
 Iowa Highway 221 (former)
 K-221 (Kansas highway) (former)
 Kentucky Route 221
 Maine State Route 221
 Minnesota State Highway 221 (former)
 Montana Secondary Highway 221
 Nevada State Route 221
 New Mexico State Road 221
 New York State Route 221
 Ohio State Route 221
 Oregon Route 221
 Pennsylvania Route 221
 Tennessee State Route 221
 Texas State Highway 221 (former)
 Texas State Highway Loop 221 (former)
 Utah State Route 221 (former)
 Washington State Route 221
 Wyoming Highway 221